Karen Margrethe Juul (born 23 December 1975) is a Danish professional golfer.

Amateur career
Juul was born in Esbjerg, Denmark. She practically grew up on the golf course, her mother a national team player, and started training golf at 9 years old. Aged 14, she made her debut at the club's division team, and by 18 years old she participated in her first women's European Championship. The following year she won her first Danish championship in stroke play and two years after that, in 1997, won the Danish championships both in stroke and match play.

She won the 1997 Ladies' British Open Amateur Stroke Play Championship and finished seventh at the 1997 European Ladies Amateur Championship.

Juul was a member of the Danish National Team 8 years from 1994 to 2001.

Professional career
In 2001, Juul finished second in the 2001 Q-School to qualify for the Ladies European Tour and turned professional. She went on to record nine top-10 finishes including top-5 finishes at the 2005 Wales Ladies Championship of Europe, 2006 Deutsche Bank Ladies Swiss Open and 2007 Ladies Scottish Open. In 2006, she held off a final-day challenge from Laura Davies and Trish Johnson to seal victory in the Nykredit Masters by four strokes, clinching her first Ladies European Tour title, after a closing 68 gave a 15-under-par total of 273. This was the culmination of her career and she finished tenth on the 2006 Order of Merit rankings.

In 2007 she represented Denmark at the Women's World Cup of Golf with Iben Tinning.

Juul retired from professional golf in December 2010.

Amateur wins
1997 Ladies' British Open Amateur Stroke Play Championship
1998 Helen Holm Scottish Women's Open Championship

Professional wins

Ladies European Tour wins (1)
2006 Nykredit Masters

Other wins (1)
2008 Ladies Mauritius Open

Team appearances
Amateur
European Girls' Team Championship (representing Denmark): 1993
Espirito Santo Trophy (representing Denmark): 1996, 1998
European Ladies' Team Championship (representing Denmark): 1995, 1997, 1999, 2001, 2003

Professional
World Cup (representing Denmark): 2007

References

External links

Danish female golfers
Ladies European Tour golfers
Sportspeople from the Region of Southern Denmark
People from Esbjerg
1975 births
Living people